Sir Michael Keane KCSI, CIE (14 June 1874 – 10 August 1937) was a British colonial administrator in India. He was Governor of Assam from 1932 to 1937.

References

Governors of Assam
1874 births
1937 deaths
Place of birth missing
Place of death missing
Alumni of University College Dublin
Knights Commander of the Order of the Star of India
Companions of the Order of the Indian Empire
British people in colonial India